Rok Božič (born 23 January 1985) is a former Slovenian footballer who played as a midfielder.

Honours
Koper
Slovenian Cup: 2005–06, 2006–07

References

External links

1985 births
Living people
People from Izola
Slovenian footballers
Association football midfielders
FC Koper players
NK Triglav Kranj players
Slovenian expatriate footballers
Slovenian expatriate sportspeople in Italy
Expatriate footballers in Italy
Slovenian PrvaLiga players
Slovenian Second League players
Slovenia youth international footballers
Slovenia under-21 international footballers